Henry Colin Waine (19 January 1913 – 3 September 1995) was a New Zealand cricketer. He played in three first-class matches for Canterbury in 1944/45.

See also
 List of Canterbury representative cricketers

References

External links
 

1913 births
1995 deaths
New Zealand cricketers
Canterbury cricketers
Cricketers from Christchurch